Tolypers (Tulipers) is a chemical and consumer goods company based in Iran. The company produces laundry detergent under the same name, which is sold in Iran and 17 other countries.

The company also manufactures detergent powder, soaps, shampoos, dishwashing liquids, hand washing liquids, and toothpaste powders. The company was founded in 1971 and is based in Tehran, Iran.

The company has been listed on the Tehran Stock Exchange since 1997.

References

External links
Company Site

Manufacturing companies based in Tehran
Companies listed on the Tehran Stock Exchange
Trademarks
Laundry detergents
Chemical companies established in 1971
Iranian brands
1971 establishments in Iran